The Mingei International Museum is a non-profit public institution that collects, conserves and exhibits folk art, craft and design. The museum was  founded in 1974, and its building opened in 1978. The word mingei, meaning 'art of the people,' was coined by the Japanese scholar Dr. Sōetsu Yanagi by combining the Japanese words for all people (min 民) and art (gei 芸).

History
Mingei International Museum was founded by Martha Longenecker, Professor of Art Emerita, San Diego State University.  As an artist craftsman who studied pottery-making in Japan, she became acquainted with and learned from the founders and leaders of the Mingei Association of Japan. Under her guidance, the museum was established and developed over more than 27 years.

In May 1978, Mingei International Museum of World Folk Art opened at University Towne Centre in San Diego with the exhibition, Dolls and Folk Toys of the World.

In August 1996, Mingei International was relocated to the historic House of Charm on the Plaza de Panama in Balboa Park. It shares the central square with the San Diego Museum of Art and the Timken Museum of Art.

In 2003, Mingei International opened a second museum in downtown Escondido, in North San Diego County.  The premiere exhibition, Niki de Saint Phalle Remembered featured the artist's work from the museum's permanent collection and loans from the Niki Charitable Art Foundation.

In its 30-year history, Mingei International has presented 140 exhibitions, accompanied by related lectures, films, demonstrations, workshops, music, theater and dance.

Mingei International Museum closed its Escondido museum galleries to the public on June 26, 2010.

Collections
The museum's collections comprise 17,500 objects from 141 countries.  The collections contain artifacts from the 3rd century BCE to the present day and include objects as diverse as ancient clay vessels and 21st-century Venetian glass.

Several regions of the world are represented.
 Mexico: pottery, wood carvings, textiles, retablos, masks
 India: bronzes, wood carvings, pottery, textiles
 China: costumes, jewelry, wood carvings, pottery
 Japan: pottery, textiles, wood carvings, lacquer ware, metal work
 Indonesia: ancestral monuments, wood carvings, textiles, masks, sculptures
 Africa: pottery, head rests, stools, masks, textiles
 Pre-Columbian: pottery and textiles from Central and South America
 Middle East: textiles, jewelry, wood carvings
 US: mid 20th-century pottery; contemporary furniture, textiles, glass; Navajo weavings

References

Further reading

External links 

 
 See-Mingei, an online interactive presentation of the museum's collections
 Frommers

Balboa Park (San Diego)
Museums in San Diego
Decorative arts museums in the United States
Folk art museums and galleries in California
Art museums established in 1974
1974 establishments in California